This is a list of minor planets named after places, organized by continent.

Africa
1193 Africa (Africa)

Countries of Africa
1197 Rhodesia (Rhodesia, now Zimbabwe)
1213 Algeria (Algeria)
1268 Libya (Libya)
1278 Kenya (Kenya)
1279 Uganda (Uganda)
1430 Somalia (Somalia)
1432 Ethiopia (Ethiopia)
1638 Ruanda (Rwanda)
1712 Angola (Angola)
1718 Namibia (Namibia)
1816 Liberia (Liberia)
8766 Niger (Niger)
19913 Aigyptios (Ancient Greek name of Egypt)

Cities of Africa
790 Pretoria (Pretoria, South Africa)
858 El Djezaïr (Algiers, Algeria)
859 Bouzaréah (Bouzareah, Algeria))
6362 Tunis (Tunis, Tunisia)
1245 Calvinia (Calvinia, Northern Cape, South Africa)
1428 Mombasa (Mombasa, Kenya)
1431 Luanda (Luanda, city in Angola)
1948 Kampala (Kampala, city in Uganda)
1949 Messina (Messina, town in South Africa)
42776 Casablanca (Casablanca, Morocco)
68718 Safi (Safi, Morocco)
260824 Hermanus (Hermanus, Western Cape, South Africa)
321484 Marsaalam (Marsa Alam, Egypt)

Provinces of Africa
1195 Orangia (Orange Free State Province, former South Africa province)
1242 Zambesia (Zambezia Province of Mozambique)

Mountain / Hills of Africa
10377 Kilimanjaro (Kilimanjaro, the highest mountain in Africa).
69228 Kamerunberg (Mount Cameroon (Kamerunberg), Cameroon)

Desert in Africa
134369 Sahara (Sahara, the third largest desert in the world)

River in Africa
 35295 Omo (Omo River, aka Omo-Bottego, Ethiopia)

Asia
67 Asia (Asia)
1157 Arabia (Arabia)
2178 Kazakhstania (Kazakhstan)
2169 Taiwan (Taiwan)
16563 Ob (Ob River in central Asia)
27596 Maldives (Maldives)

Japan

498 Tokio (Tokyo)
727 Nipponia (Japan)
1089 Tama (Tama River in Tokyo)
1090 Sumida (Sumida River in Tokyo)
1098 Hakone (Hakone, Kanagawa)
1584 Fuji (Mount Fuji)
2084 Okayama (Okayama)
2247 Hiroshima (Hiroshima)
3319 Kibi (Kibi)
3380 Awaji (Awaji)
3720 Hokkaido (Hokkaidō)
4157 Izu (Izu)
4578 Kurashiki (Kurashiki)
4774 Hobetsu (Hobetsu)
5618 Saitama (Saitama)
5881 Akashi (Akashi)
5908 Aichi (Nagoya)
6134 Kamagari (Kamagari, Hiroshima)
6218 Mizushima (Mizushima)
6255 Kuma (Kumakogen)
6879 Hyogo (Hyōgo)
6991 Chichibu (Chichibu, Saitama)
7253 Nara (Nara)
8120 Kobe (Kobe)
8892 Kakogawa (Kakogawa)
9782 Edo (Edo)
9791 Kamiyakurai (Yakuraisan, popularly called Kami Fuji, a mountain)
9792 Nonodakesan (Nonodakesan, a mountain)
10091 Bandaisan (Mount Bandai, Fukushima)
10141 Gotenba (Gotemba, Shizuoka)
10143 Kamogawa (Kamo-gawa or Kamo River)
10159 Tokara (Tokara)
10161 Nakanoshima (Nakanoshima, narrow sandbank in Kita-ku, Osaka)
10163 Onomichi (Onomichi)
10864 Yamagatashi (Yamagata, Yamagata)
10878 Moriyama (Moriyama, Shiga)
11612 Obu (Ōbu)
11925 Usubae (Usubae, a beach in Cape Ashizuri in Kōchi)
12706 Tanezaki (Tanezaki, a beach in Urado Bay, Kōchi)
12749 Odokaigan (Odokaigan, a beach on the Otsuki Peninsula)
16680 Minamitanemachi (Minamitanemachi, Tanegashima Island, Kagoshima)
16713 Airashi (Airashi, Kagoshima Prefecture)
19303 Chinacyo (Chinacyo, Okinoerabujima Island)
19953 Takeo (Takeo, Saga)
17286 Bisei (Bisei, Okayama)
20625 Noto (Noto)
33056 Ogunimachi (Oguni, Niigata)
33553 Nagai (Nagai, Yamagata)
35093 Akicity (Aki, Kōchi)
36472 Ebina (Ebina, Kanagawa)
36783 Kagamino (Kagamino, Okayama)
37720 Kawanishi (Kawanishi, Yamagata)
40994 Tekaridake (Mount Tekari (Tekari-dake))
46595 Kita-Kyushu (Kitakyushu, Fukuoka Prefecture)
48736 Ehime (Ehime)
48807 Takahata (Takahata, Yamagata)
52260 Ureshino (Ureshino, Saga)
53157 Akaishidake (Mount Akaishi (Akaishi-dake))
55873 Shiomidake (Mount Shiomi (Shiomi-dake))
79152 Abukumagawa (Abukuma River (Abukuma-gawa))
87271 Kokubunji (Kokubunji, Tokyo)
94356 Naruto (Naruto Strait)
96254 Hoyo (Hōyo Strait)
100266 Sadamisaki (Sadamisaki Peninsula, Shikoku)
118230 Sado (Sado, Niigata)
136743 Echigo (Echigo Province, an old province, now Niigata Prefecture minus the island of Sado)
145062 Hashikami (Hashikami, Aomori)
181043 Anan (Anan, Tokushima)
220736 Niihama (Niihama, Ehime)
262419 Suzaka (Suzaka, Nagano)
333639 Yaima (Yaeyama Islands, Okinawa)

Cambodia
16770 Angkor Wat (Angkor Wat, Cambodia)

China

Country
1125 China (China)
3789 Zhongguo (China)

Cities, mountains, and rivers
2045 Peking (Beijing)
2077 Kiangsu (Jiangsu)
2078 Nanking (Nanjing, Jiangsu)
2085 Henan (Henan)
2162 Anhui (Anhui)
2184 Fujian (Fujian)
2185 Guangdong (Guangdong)
2197 Shanghai (Shanghai)
2209 Tianjin (Tianjin)
2215 Sichuan (Sichuan)
2230 Yunnan (Yunnan)
2255 Qinghai (Qinghai)
2263 Shaanxi (Shaanxi)
2336 Xinjiang (Xinjiang)
2344 Xizang (Xizang)
2355 Nei Monggol (Inner Mongolia)
2380 Heilongjiang (Heilongjiang)
2387 Xi'an (Xi'an, Shaanxi)
2398 Jilin (Jilin)
2425 Shenzhen (Shenzhen, Guangdong)
2503 Liaoning (Liaoning)
2505 Hebei (Hebei)
2510 Shandong (Shandong)
2514 Taiyuan (Taiyuan, Shanxi)
2515 Gansu (Gansu)
2539 Ningxia (Ningxia)
2547 Hubei (Hubei)
2592 Hunan (Hunan)
2617 Jiangxi (Jiangxi)
2631 Zhejiang (Zhejiang)
2632 Guizhou (Guizhou)
2655 Guangxi (Guangxi)
2693 Yan'an (Yan'an, Shaanxi)
2719 Suzhou (Suzhou, Jiangsu)
2729 Urumqi (Urumqi, Xinjiang)
2743 Chengdu (Chengdu, Sichuan)
2778 Tangshan (Tangshan, Hebei)
2789 Foshan (Foshan, Guangdong)
2851 Harbin (Harbin, Heilongjiang)
2903 Zhuhai (Zhuhai, Guangdong)
3011 Chongqing (Chongqing)
3024 Hainan (Hainan)
3048 Guangzhou (Guangzhou, Guangdong)
3051 Nantong (Nantong, Jiangsu)
3088 Jinxiuzhonghua (Splendid China, themed park in Shenzhen)
3136 Anshan (Anshan, Liaoning)
3139 Shantou (Shantou, Guangdong)
3187 Dalian (Dalian, Liaoning)
3206 Wuhan (Wuhan, Hubei)
3239 Meizhou (Meizhou, Guangdong)
3297 Hong Kong (Hong Kong)
3335 Quanzhou (Quanzhou, Fujian)
3494 Purple Mountain (Purple Mountain Observatory)
3613 Kunlun (Kunlun Mountains)
3650 Kunming (Kunming, Yunnan)
3729 Yangzhou (Yangzhou, Jiangsu)
4273 Dunhuang (Dunhuang, Gansu)
7859 Lhasa (Lhasa, Tibet)
8423 Macao (Macau)
12418 Tongling (Tongling, Anhui)
12757 Yangtze (Yangtze River)
15001 Fuzhou (Fuzhou, Fujian)
35366 Kaifeng (Kaifeng, Henan)
69869 Haining (Haining, Zhejiang)
72060 Hohhot (Hohhot, Inner Mongolia)
79418 Zhangjiajie (Zhangjiajie, Hunan)
79316 Huangshan (Huangshan City, Anhui)
110297 Yellowriver (Yellow River)
160105 Gobi (Gobi Desert a large desert region in Asia, share with Mongolia)
175633 Yaoan (Yaoan, Yunnan)
178151 Kulangsu (Gulangyu Island (Kulangsu), Xiamen)
185577 Hhaihao (Haikou (Hhaihao City), Hainan)
207717 Sa'a (Sanya, Hainan)
207931 Weihai (Weihai, Shandong)
216343 Wenchang (Wenchang, Hainan)
248388 Namtso, (Namtso, a lake in Tibet)
362177 Anji (Anji, Zhejiang)

India
78118 Bharat (Bhārat Ganarājya, native name of the Republic of India)
85267 Taj Mahal (Taj Mahal)

Indonesia
536 Merapi (Mount Marapi, West Sumatra)
732 Tjilaki (Cilaki River, West Java)
754 Malabar (Mount Malabar, West Java)
770 Bali (Bali Island)
772 Tanete (Tanete, Sulawesi)
46824 Tambora (Mount Tambora, Sumbawa, West Nusa Tenggara)
85047 Krakatau (Krakatoa, a volcanic island situated in the Sunda Strait, between Java and Sumatra)
118102 Rinjani (Mount Rinjani, Lombok Island, West Nusa Tenggara)

Korea
 12252 Gwangju (Gwangju, South Jeolla)
 31179 Gongju (Gongju, South Chungcheong)
 34666 Bohyunsan (Bohyeon Mountain)

Nepal
 33002 Everest (Mount Everest, the highest mountain in the world)

Middle East
 697 Galilea (Galilee)
 7079 Baghdad (Baghdad, Iraq)
 7507 Israel (Israel)
 13128 Aleppo (Aleppo, Syria)
 13131 Palmyra (Palmyra, Syria)
 15417 Babylon (Babylon, capital of ancient Mesopotamia)
 15861 Ispahan (Ispahan, Iran)
 22260 Ur (Ur, city-state of ancient Mesopotamia)
 22292 Mosul (Mosul, Iraq)
 30936 Basra (Basra, Iraq)
 56000 Mesopotamia (Mesopotamia)
 63163 Jerusalem (Jerusalem)
 282903 Masada (Masada)

Philippines
 13513 Manila (Manila, the capital of the Philippines)
 134346 Pinatubo (Mount Pinatubo, volcano on Luzon island in the Philippines)

Vietnam
 7816 Hanoi (Hanoi)

Russia and the former Soviet Union (Asia)
780 Armenia (Armenia)
1094 Siberia (Siberia, Russia)
2593 Buryatia (Buryatia, Russia)
2657 Bashkiria (Bashkortostan (Bashkiria), Russia)
2671 Abkhazia (Abkhazia, now in Georgia)
2120 Tyumenia (Tyumen Oblast, Russia)
2140 Kemerovo (Kemerovo, Russian SFSR, now Russia)
2297 Daghestan (Daghestan, Russia)
2566 Kirghizia (Kirghiz SSR, now Kyrgyzstan)
2584 Turkmenia (Turkmen SSR, now Turkmenistan)
2698 Azerbajdzhan (Azerbaijan)
2700 Baikonur (Baikonur Cosmodrome, Kazakhstan)
2776 Baikal (Lake Baikal, Russia)
5471 Tunguska (Tunguska, Russia)
21054 Ojmjakon (Oymyakon (Ojmjakon), Siberia, the coldest city in the earth)
65541 Kasbek (Mount Kazbek, Georgia)
210271 Samarkand (Samarkand, the ancient city in Uzbekistan)
212998 Tolbachik (Tolbachik, a volcano complex in Kamchatka Peninsula)

Sri Lanka
311231 Anuradhapura (Anuradhapura)

Europe
136 Austria (Austria)
257 Silesia (Silesia)
1381 Danubia (River Danube)
1391 Carelia (Karelia)
2206 Gabrova (Gabrovo, Bulgaria)
2236 Austrasia (Austrasia, historic region from western Germany to eastern France)
7671 Albis (Latin name for the Elbe)
8020 Erzgebirge (German name for the Ore Mountains)
10957 Alps (Alps, a great mountain chain stretching from the Mediterranean Sea between southern France and Italy)
22618 Silva Nortica (Silva Nortica, a region at the border of Austria and the Czech Republic)
40092 Memel (the other name of Neman River)
293909 Matterhorn (Matterhorn, a mountain of the Alps)

Austria
96506 Oberösterreich (Upper Austria (Oberösterreich))
117156 Altschwendt (Altschwendt, a municipality in Upper Austria)
175730 Gramastetten (Gramastetten, a municipality in Upper Austria)
178243 Schaerding (Schärding, Upper Austria)
181824 Königsleiten (Königsleiten, a village in Wald im Pinzgau municipality, Salzburg)
185633 Rainbach (Rainbach im Innkreis, a municipality in Upper Austria)

Baltic States (Estonia, Latvia, Lithuania)
1284 Latvia (Latvia)
1541 Estonia (Estonia)
1796 Riga (Riga, Latvia)
2577 Litva (Lithuania)
3072 Vilnius (Vilnius, Lithuania)
4163 Saaremaa (Saaremaa, Estonia)
4227 Kaali (Kaali crater, Estonia)
13995 Tõravere (Tõravere, Estonia)
23617 Duna (Riga, Latvia)
24709 Mitau (Jelgava, Latvia)
24794 Kurland (Courland, Latvia)
31267 Kuldiga (Kuldīga, Latvia)
35618 Tartu (Tartu, Estonia)
37623 Valmiera (Valmiera, Latvia)
73059 Kaunas (Kaunas, Lithuania)
124192 Moletai (Molėtai, Lithuania)
140628 Klaipeda (Klaipėda, Lithuania)
151430 Nemunas (Nemunas River, the largest river in Lithuania)
157534 Siauliai (Šiauliai, Lithuania)
166229 Palanga (Palanga, Lithuania)
185150 Panevezys (Panevėžys, Lithuania)
202704 Utena (Utena, Lithuania)
233661 Alytus (Alytus, Lithuania)
274084 Baldone (Baldone, Latvia)
289020 Ukmerge (Ukmerge, Lithuania)
294664 Trakai (Trakai, Lithuania)

Benelux (Belgium, Netherlands, Luxembourg)
1052 Belgica (Belgium)
1132 Hollandia (Holland)
1133 Lugduna (Leiden, Netherlands)
1276 Ucclia (Uccle, Belgium)
1294 Antwerpia (Antwerp, Belgium)
1336 Zeelandia (Zeeland, Netherlands)
2689 Bruxelles (Brussels, Belgium)
2713 Luxembourg (Luxembourg)
3374 Namur (Namur, Belgium)
9471 Ostend (Ostend, Belgium)
9472 Bruges (Bruges, Belgium)
9473 Ghent (Ghent, Belgium)
11945 Amsterdam (Amsterdam, Netherlands)
12652 Groningen (Groningen, Netherlands)
17437 Stekene (Stekene, Belgium)
20243 Den Bosch (Den Bosch, Netherlands)
27718 Gouda (Gouda, Netherlands)
30835 Waterloo (Waterloo, Belgium)
346886 Middelburg (Middelburg, Netherlands)

Bulgaria 
 2575 Bulgaria (Bulgaria)
 2530 Shipka (Shipka Mount and Shipka Pass)
 3860 Plovdiv (Plovdiv)
 6267 Rozhen ( – a locality in the Rhodope Mountains, where the Rozhen Observatory is located)
 11852 Shoumen (Shumen (Shoumen) University)
 12246 Pliska (Pliska)
 510466 Varna (Varna)

Czech Republic
371 Bohemia (Bohemia)
1901 Moravia (Moravia)
1942 Jablunka (Jablunka)
2080 Jihlava (Jihlava)
2081 Sázava (Sázava River)
2123 Vltava (Vltava River)
2199 Kleť (Kleť, a hill and its observatory, place of discovery)
2321 Lužnice (Lužnice River)
2337 Boubín (Boubín, a hill)
2367 Praha (Prague)
2390 Nežárka (Nežárka River)
2403 Šumava (Šumava)
2524 Budovicium (Latin name for České Budějovice)
2599 Veselí (Veselí)
2613 Plzeň (Plzeň)
2672 Písek (Písek)
2747 Český Krumlov (Český Krumlov)
2811 Střemchoví (Střemchoví, birthplace of discoverer)
2889 Brno (Brno)
3137 Horky (Horký, a hill)
3735 Třeboň (Třeboň)
4054 Turnov (Turnov)
4249 Křemže (Křemže)
4277 Holubov (Holubov)
4405 Otava (Otava River)
4408 Zlatá Koruna (Zlatá Koruna)
4610 Kájov (Kájov)
4698 Jizera (Jizera River)
4702 Berounka (Berounka River)
4801 Ohře (Ohře River)
4823 Libenice (Libenice)
4824 Stradonice (Stradonice)
5894 Telč (Telč)
6060 Doudleby (Doudleby)
6064 Holašovice (Holašovice)
6802 Černovice (Černovice)
7118 Kuklov (Kuklov)
7204 Ondřejov (Ondřejov)
7440 Závist (Závist)
7498 Blaník (Blaník, a hill)
7532 Pelhřimov (Pelhřimov)
7669 Malše (Malše River)
7694 Krasetín (Krasetín)
7711 Říp (Říp Mountain)
8554 Gabreta (ancient name for Bohemian Forest)
9711 Želetava (Želetava)
9884 Příbram (Příbram)
11128 Ostravia (Latin name for Ostrava)
11134 České Budějovice (České Budějovice)
11163 Milešovka (Milešovka, a mountain)
11167 Kunžak (Kunžak)
11339 Orlík (Orlík a castle and a dam)
11656 Lipno (Lipno Dam)
12406 Zvíkov (Zvíkov Castle)
12468 Zachotín (Zachotín)
12833 Kamenný Újezd (Kamenný Újezd)
13804 Hrazany (Hrazany)
14537 Týn nad Vltavou (Týn nad Vltavou)
14974 Počátky (Počátky)
15890 Prachatice (Prachatice)
15960 Hluboká (Hluboká nad Vltavou, a castle)
16801 Petřínpragensis (Petřín, a hill in Prague)
17600 Dobřichovice (Dobřichovice)
17607 Táborsko (Táborsko, Czech district)
18497 Nevězice (Nevězice)
18531 Strakonice (Strakonice)
20254 Úpice (Úpice)
20964 Mons Naklethi (old name of the hill Kleť)
21257 Jižní Čechy (Jižní Čechy, English: South Bohemia, a Czech Republic region)
21290 Vydra (Vydra River)
21873 Jindřichůvhradec (Jindřichův Hradec)
22450 Nové Hrady (Nové Hrady)
24837 Mšecké Žehrovice (Mšecké Žehrovice)
24838 Abilunon (Abilunon, nowadays non-existing ancient town)
26328 Litomyšl (Litomyšl)
26971 Sezimovo Ústí (Sezimovo Ústí)
27079 Vsetín (Vsetín)
27088 Valmez (Valašské Meziříčí)
30564 Olomouc (Olomouc)
31650 Frýdek-Místek (Frýdek-Místek)
31232 Slavonice (Slavonice)
31323 Lysá hora (Lysá hora, a mountain)
31238 Kroměříž (Kroměříž)
40206 Lhenice (Lhenice)
43954 Chýnov (Chýnov)
47294 Blanský les (Blanský les, highlands)
49448 Macocha (Macocha Gorge)
59001 Senftenberg (Senftenberg, now Žamberk, Pardubice)
61208 Stonařov (Stonařov)
68779 Schöninger (old name for the hill Kleť)
121089 Vyšší Brod (Vyšší Brod)
159743 Kluk (Kluk, a Czech hill near Kleť mountain)
159799 Kralice (Kralice nad Oslavou, a municipality in Třebíč District)
167208 Lelekovice (Lelekovice, a village in Brno-Country District)
175017 Záboří (Záboří, a municipality in České Budějovice District)
215841 Čimelice (Čimelice, a village in Písek District)
270556 Kolonica (Kolonica, a municipality in Snina District)

Denmark
2117 Danmark (Danmark, Danish for Denmark)
13586 Copenhagen (Copenhagen, Denmark)

Eastern Europe
183 Istria (Istria, Croatia)
434 Hungaria (Hungary)
589 Croatia (Croatia)
1140 Crimea (Crimean Peninsula)
1160 Illyria (Illyria, Croatia)
1517 Beograd (Belgrade, capital of Serbia)
1537 Transylvania (Transylvania, Romania)
1989 Tatry (Tatra Mountains)
2315 Czechoslovakia (Czechoslovakia, now the Czech Republic and Slovakia)
2575 Bulgaria (Bulgaria)
9674 Slovenija (Slovenia)
10415 Mali Lošinj (Mali Lošinj, Croatia)
12123 Pazin (Pazin, Croatia)
12124 Hvar (Hvar, Croatia)
13121 Tisza (Tisza River)
38674 Těšínsko (Těšínsko, a region in south-eastern Silesia, nowadays in the Czech Republic and Poland)
82071 Debrecen (Debrecen, Hungary)
82092 Kalocsa (Kalocsa, Hungary)
100897 Piatra Neamt (Piatra Neamț, Romania)
178267 Sarajevo (Sarajevo, the capital and largest city of Bosnia and Herzegovina)
187700 Zagreb (Zagreb, Croatia)

Finland
1460 Haltia (Halti)
1471 Tornio (Tornio)
1472 Muonio (Muonio)
1473 Ounas (Ounasjoki)
1488 Aura (Aura river)
1494 Savo (Savonia)
1495 Helsinki (Helsinki)
1496 Turku (Turku)
1497 Tampere (Tampere)
1498 Lahti (Lahti)
1499 Pori (Pori)
1500 Jyväskylä (Jyväskylä)
1503 Kuopio (Kuopio)
1504 Lappeenranta (Lappeenranta)
1507 Vaasa (Vaasa)
1518 Rovaniemi (Rovaniemi)
1519 Kajaani (Kajaani)
1520 Imatra (Imatra)
1521 Seinäjoki (Seinäjoki)
1522 Kokkola (Kokkola)
1523 Pieksämäki (Pieksämäki)
1524 Joensuu (Joensuu)
1525 Savonlinna (Savonlinna)
1526 Mikkeli (Mikkeli)
1532 Inari (Lake Inari)
1533 Saimaa (Saimaa)
1534 Näsi (Näsijärvi)
1535 Päijänne (Lake Päijänne)
1536 Pielinen (Pielinen)
1656 Suomi (Finland)
1659 Punkaharju (Punkaharju)
1757 Porvoo (Porvoo)
1758 Naantali (Naantali)
1882 Rauma (Rauma)
1883 Rimito (Rimito)
1928 Summa (Summa)
1929 Kollaa (Kollaa)
2291 Kevo (Kevo)
2292 Seili (Seili)
2299 Hanko (Hanko)
2397 Lappajärvi (Lappajärvi)
2479 Sodankylä (Sodankylä)
2501 Lohja (Lohja)
2512 Tavastia (Tavastia)
2535 Hämeenlinna (Hämeenlinna)
2678 Aavasaksa (Aavasaksa)
2679 Kittisvaara (Kittisvaara)
2733 Hamina (Hamina)
2737 Kotka (Kotka)
2750 Loviisa (Loviisa)
2774 Tenojoki (Tenojoki)
2820 Iisalmi (Iisalmi)
2840 Kallavesi (Kallavesi)
2841 Puijo (Puijo)

France

20 Massalia (old name of Marseille)
21 Lutetia (old name of Paris)
138 Tolosa (old name of Toulouse)
148 Gallia (Gaul,  the Latin name for France)
374 Burgundia (Burgundy)
971 Alsatia (Alsace)
3317 Paris (Paris)
4690 Strasbourg (Strasbourg)
6177 Fécamp (Fécamp, a commune in Seine-Maritime department in the Normandy region)
6268 Versailles (Versailles)
8371 Goven (Goven)
9381 Lyon (Lyon)
9385 Avignon (Avignon)
10735 Seine (Seine River)
48159 Saint-Véran (Saint-Véran, Hautes-Alpes)
100033 Taizé (Taizé, Saône-et-Loire)
100122 Alpes Maritimes (Alpes-Maritimes, a department of the Provence-Alpes-Côte d'Azur)
128633 Queyras (Queyras, a valley)
128627 Ottmarsheim (Ottmarsheim, Grand Est)
133404 Morogues (Morogues, Centre-Val de Loire)
181702 Forcalquier (Forcalquier, Alpes-de-Haute)
224592 Carnac (Carnac, Morbihan)
229631 Cluny (Cluny, Saône-et-Loire)
291847 Ladoix (Ladoix, a village / commune in Côte-d'Or department in the Bourgogne-Franche-Comté region)
297026 Corton (Aloxe-Corton, a village / commune in Côte-d'Or department in the Bourgogne-Franche-Comté region)
314808 Martindutertre (Saint-Martin-du-Tertre, Val-d'Oise)
336108 Luberon (Luberon)
349606 Fleurance (Fleurance)
375007 Buxy (Buxy, a commune in Saône-et-Loire department in the Bourgogne region)
371220 Angers (Angers)
423205 Echezeaux (Flagey-Echezeaux, a village / commune between Beaune and Dijon)
469748 Volnay (Volnay, a commune in Côte-d'Or department in the Bourgogne-Franche-Comté region)

Germany

Country
241 Germania (Germany)

Cities and towns
263 Dresda, (Dresden)
325 Heidelberga (Heidelberg)
386 Siegena (Siegen)
526 Jena (Jena)
449 Hamburga (Hamburg)
811 Nauheima (Bad Nauheim)
2424 Tautenburg (Tautenburg)
3539 Weimar (Weimar)
5199 Dortmund (Dortmund)
5816 Potsdam (Potsdam)
5820 Babelsberg (Potsdam-Babelsberg)
9336 Altenburg (Altenburg)
10114 Greifswald (Greifswald)
10746 Mühlhausen (Mühlhausen)
10774 Eisenach (Eisenach)
10775 Leipzig (Leipzig)
10801 Lüneburg (Lüneburg, Lower Saxony)
52334 Oberammergau (Oberammergau)
55735 Magdeburg (Magdeburg, Saxony-Anhalt)
75058 Hanau (Hanau, Hesse)
79138 Mansfeld (Mansfeld, Saxony-Anhalt)
85196 Halle (Halle (Saale), Saxony-Anhalt)
100046 Worms (Worms, Rhineland-Palatinate)
113256 Prüm (Prüm, Rhineland-Palatinate)
117506 Wildberg (Wildberg, Baden-Württemberg)
118173 Barmen (Barmen, Wuppertal)
133243 Essen (Essen)
104020 Heilbronn (Heilbronn, Baden-Württemberg)
142408 Trebur (Trebur, Frankfurt Rhine-Main)
149884 Radebeul (Radebeul)
183182 Weinheim (Weinheim, Baden-Württemberg) 
204852 Frankfurt (Frankfurt)
207763 Oberursel (Oberursel, Frankfurt Rhein-Main Regional Authority)
221516 Bergen-Enkheim (Bergen-Enkheim, Frankfurt am Main)
241418 Darmstadt (Darmstadt, Hesse)
274835 Aachen (Aachen, North Rhine-Westphalia)
279723 Wittenberg (Wittenberg, Saxony-Anhalt)
281140 Trier (Trier)
281764 Schwetzingen (Schwetzingen, Baden-Württemberg) 
295565 Hannover (Hannover)
301061 Egelsbach (Egelsbach, Frankfurt Rhine-Main)
301394 Bensheim (Bensheim)
340980 Bad Vilbel (Bad Vilbel)
350178 Eisleben (Eisleben)
365159 Garching (Garching)
405207 Konstanz (Konstanz)
501132 Runkel (Runkel)

Regions / municipality
301 Bavaria (Bavaria)
418 Alemannia (Alemannia)
930 Westphalia (Westphalia)
5616 Vogtland (Vogtland)
5628 Preussen (Preußen (Preussen), German word for Prussia)
5846 Hessen (Hessen, German word for Hesse)
5866 Sachsen (Sachsen, German word for Saxony)
5904 Württemberg (Baden-Württemberg)
6068 Brandenburg (Brandenburg)
6070 Rheinland (Rhineland)	
6099 Saarland (Saarland)
6120 Anhalt
6124 Mecklenburg (Mecklenburg)
6209 Schwaben (Schwaben, German word for Swabia)
6293 Oberpfalz (Oberpfalz German word for Upper Palatinate)
6305 Helgoland (Heligoland,  a small German archipelago in the North Sea)
6320 Bremen (Bremen)
6332 Vorarlberg (Vorarlberg)
6396 Schleswig (Duchy of Schleswig)
6402 Holstein (Holstein)
21074 Rügen (Rügen,  Germany's largest island by area)
22322 Bodensee (Bodensee, German word for Lake Constance, a lake on the Rhine at the northern foot of the Alps)
73686 Nussdorf (Nußdorf, a village in Rhineland-Palatinate)
73699 Landaupfalz (Landau/Pfalz, Rhineland-Palatinate)
85214 Sommersdorf (Sommersdorf, a municipality in Saxony-Anhalt)
90711 Stotternheim (Stotternheim, a village in Thuringia)
342000 Neumünster (Neumünster, Schleswig-Holstein)
365130 Birnfeld (Birnfeld, a village in northern Bavaria)
410928 Maidbronn (Maidbronn, a small village in northern Bavaria)
425442 Eberstadt (Eberstadt, a municipality in Baden-Württemberg)

Mountains / mountain range / hills
10245 Inselsberg (Großer Inselsberg, a mountain in Thuringian Forest)
10246 Frankenwald (Frankenwald or Franconian Forest, a mountain range in Northern Bavaria)
10248 Fichtelgebirge (Fichtelgebirge or Fichtel Mountains, a mountain range in northeastern Bavaria)
10249 Harz (Harz, a mountain range in northern Germany)
10253 Westerwald (Westerwald, a mountain range in Rhineland-Palatinate, Hesse and North Rhine-Westphalia)
10254 Hunsrück (Hunsrück, a mountain range in Rhineland-Palatinate)
10255 Taunus (Taunus, a mountain range in Hesse)
150118 Petersberg (Petersberg, a hill near Halle)
293809 Zugspitze (Zugspitze, the highest mountain in Germany)
365131 Hassberge (Haßberge Hills, a hill range in Bavaria)

Greece
582 Olympia (Olympia)
1119 Euboea (Euboea)
1138 Attica (Attica)
1142 Aetolia (Aetolia)
1150 Achaia (Achaea)
1151 Ithaka (Ithaca)
1161 Thessalia (Thessaly)
4356 Marathon (Marathon)
4357 Korinthos (Corinth)
49036 Pelion (Mount Pelion, Thessaly)
73769 Delphi (Delphi, archaeological site and modern town)
110293 Oia (Oia)

Hungary
434 Hungaria (Hungary)
908 Buda (Buda)
2242 Balaton (Lake Balaton)
3103 Eger (Eger)
28196 Szeged (Szeged)
82071 Debrecen (Debrecen)
107052 Aquincum (Aquincum)
129259 Tapolca (Tapolca)
157141 Sopron (Sopron)
159974 Badacsony (Badacsony)
111468 Alba Regia (Alba Regia, Roman name for Székesfehérvár)
161349 Mecsek (Mecsek, a mountain range)
167341 Börzsöny (Börzsöny, a mountain range)
171118 Szigetköz (Szigetköz Island)
209791 Tokaj (Tokaj)
217398 Tihany (Tihany, a village in Veszprém County)

Iceland
39529 Vatnajökull (Vatnajökull (Glacier of Lakes), the largest glacier in Iceland)
85095 Hekla (Hekla, one of Iceland's prominent volcanoes)
110299 Iceland (Iceland)

Ireland
2320 Blarney (Blarney) (A town and townland in County Cork, Ireland)
5029 Ireland (Ireland)
10501 Ardmacha (The Irish Gaelic name of the city of Armagh, Northern Ireland)
10502 Armaghobs (Armagh Observatory, in Armagh, Northern Ireland)

Italy
363 Padua (Padua)
416 Vaticana (Vatican City)
472 Roma (Rome)
477 Italia (Italy)
487 Venetia (Venice)
704 Interamnia (Teramo)
1191 Alfaterna (Nocera Inferiore, previously called Nuceria Alfaterna)
2601 Bologna (Bologna)
3122 Florence (Florence)
4335 Verona (Verona)
4464 Vulcano (Vulcano, Italy)
4695 Mediolanum (Latin name of Milan)
10001 Palermo (Palermo, the capital of Sicily)
10038 Tanaro (Tanaro River, the longest river of Piedmont, Italy)
11249 Etna (Mount Etna, Sicily)
14486 Tuscia (the ancient name of Tuscany, region in central Italy)
13684 Borbona (Borbona, Province of Rieti)
18441 Cittadivinci (Vinci, Tuscany)
32891 Amatrice (Amatrice, a municipality)
32911 Cervara (Cervara di Roma, a municipality)
32945 Lecce (Lecce, Province of Lecce)
33100 Udine (Udine)
40134 Marsili (Marsili, a large undersea volcano in the Tyrrhenian Sea)
46692 Taormina (Taormina, Sicily)
53252 Sardegna (the Italian name of Sardinia)
66207 Carpi (Carpi, Emilia-Romagna)
78652 Quero (Quero, Veneto)
79271 Bellagio (Bellagio, Lombardy)
103966 Luni (Luni, La Spezia)
168261 Puglia (Apulia (Puglia))
129882 Ustica (Ustica, an island in Palermo)
177853 Lumezzane (Lumezzane, Brescia)
185448 Nomentum (the old name of Mentana, Lazio)
207563 Toscana (Tuscany)
214928 Carrara (Carrara, Tuscany)
216345 Savigliano (Savigliano, Piedmont)
218636 Calabria (Calabria, Southern Italy)
225076 Vallemare (Vallemare, Lazio)
236784 Livorno (Livorno)
283057 Casteldipiazza (Castel di Piazza, a village in Tuscany)
331011 Peccioli (Peccioli, Province of Pisa)
335853 Valléedaoste (Vallée d'Aoste, French name for Aosta Valley)
367436 Siena (Siena)
400193 Castión (Castiglione dei Pepoli, a municipality)

Poland
1112 Polonia (Poland)
1352 Wawel (Wawel – Kraków)
16689 Vistula (Latin name Vistula River)

Cities
690 Wratislavia (Latin name Wrocław)
764 Gedania (Latin name of Gdańsk)
1110 Jaroslawa (Paul Herget The Names of the Minor Planets Jarosław?)
1263 Varsavia (Latin name Warsaw)
1419 Danzig (German name Gdańsk)
1572 Posnania (Latin name Poznań)
12999 Toruń (Toruń)
19981 Bialystock (Białystok)
46977 Krakow (Kraków)
199950 Sierpc (Sierpc)
420779 Świdwin (Świdwin)
551231 Żywiec (Żywiec)

Regions
257 Silesia (Silesia)
38674 Těšínsko (Těšínsko, a region in south-eastern Silesia, nowadays in the Czech Republic and Poland)

Portugal
3933 Portugal (Portugal)
13599 Lisbon (Lisbon)

Russia and the former Soviet Union (Europe)

Country 
232 Russia (Russia)
1284 Latvia (Latvia)
1541 Estonia (Estonia)
2170 Byelorussia (Belarus)
2577 Litva (Lithuania)

Cities, rivers and others 
787 Moskva (Moscow, Russia)
951 Gaspra (Gaspra, Crimea)
1140 Crimea (Crimea)
1146 Biarmia (Bjarmaland, historical region in northern Russia)
1147 Stavropolis (Stavropol, Russia)
1149 Volga (Volga River)
1316 Kasan (Kazan,  Russia)
1479 Inkeri (Ingria)
1480 Aunus (Olonets, Russia)
2046 Leningrad (Leningrad, now Saint Petersburg)
2121 Sevastopol (Sevastopol, Crimea)
2141 Simferopol (Simferopol, Crimea)
2171 Kiev (Kyiv, Ukraine)
2250 Stalingrad (Stalingrad, now Volgograd)
2258 Viipuri (Vyborg, Russia)
2419 Moldavia (Moldavia)
2606 Odessa (Odessa, Ukraine)
2699 Kalinin (Kalinin, now Tver, Russia)
2922 Dikanʹka (Dykanka, Ukraine)
2983 Poltava (Poltava, Ukraine)
3006 Livadia (Livadia, Crimea)
3012 Minsk (Minsk, Belarus)
3072 Vilnius (Vilnius, Lithuania)
3242 Bakhchisaraj (Bakhchisaraj, Crimea)
3298 Massandra (Massandra, Crimea)
3373 Koktebelia (Koktebel, Crimea)
3799 Novgorod (Veliky Novgorod, Russia)
4163 Saaremaa (Saaremaa, Estonia)
4227 Kaali (Kaali crater, Estonia)
8141 Nikolaev (Mykolaiv (Nikolaev), Ukraine)
10711 Pskov (Pskov, Russia)
37645 Chebarkul (Chebarkul, Russia)
73059 Kaunas (Kaunas, Lithuania)
117240 Zhytomyr (Zhytomyr, Ukraine)
120405 Svyatylivka (Svyatylivka, Ukraine)
159011 Radomyshl (Radomyshl, Ukraine)
159181 Berdychiv (Berdychiv, Ukraine)
160013 Elbrus (Mount Elbrus, the highest mountain of the Caucasus in Russia)
175636 Zvyagel (the old name of Novohrad-Volynskyi, Ukraine)
185250 Korostyshiv (Korostyshiv, Ukraine)
190026 Iskorosten (Korosten (Iskorosten), Ukraine)
207585 Lubar (Lubar, Ukraine)
214487 Baranivka (Baranivka, Ukraine)
216439 Lyubertsy (Lyubertsy, Russia)
216451 Irsha (Irsha River, Ukraine)
217420 Olevsk (Olevsk, Ukraine)
220418 Golovyno (Golovyno, Ukraine)
221073 Ovruch (Ovruch, Ukraine)
227326 Narodychi (Narodychi, Ukraine)
237845 Neris (Neris River, Belarus)
296577 Arkhangelsk (Arkhangelsk, Russia)

Scandinavia
378 Holmia (Holmia, the Latin name for Stockholm, Sweden)
2191 Uppsala (Uppsala and Uppsala University, Sweden)
2676 Aarhus (Århus, Denmark)
6795 Örnsköldsvik (Örnsköldsvik, Sweden)
6796 Sundsvall (Sundsvall, Sweden)
6797 Östersund (Östersund, Sweden)
9358 Faro (Fårö, small island off of Gotland)
10549 Helsingborg (Helsingborg, Sweden)
10550 Malmö (Malmö, Sweden)
10551 Göteborg (Gothenburg, Sweden)
10552 Stockholm (Stockholm, Sweden)
11870 Sverige (Sverige, Swedish name for Sweden)
11871 Norge (Norge, Bokmål name for Norway)

Slovakia
1807 Slovakia (Slovakia)
4018 Bratislava (Bratislava)
9543 Nitra (Nitra)
11118 Modra (Modra)
20664 Senec (Senec)
20495 Rimavská Sobota (Rimavská Sobota)
22185 Štiavnica (Banská Štiavnica)
24260 Kriváň (Kriváň, a mountain)
25384 Partizánske (Partizánske)
38238 Holíč (Holíč)
59419 Prešov (Prešov)
194262 Nové Zámky (Nové Zámky)
347028 Važec (Važec, a village in the district of Liptovský Mikuláš, Žilina Region)
376029 Blahová (Blahová, a municipality)

Spain
804 Hispania (Spain)
945 Barcelona (Barcelona)
1159 Granada (Granada)
1188 Gothlandia (Old name of Catalonia)
2189 Zaragoza (Zaragoza)
3851 Alhambra (Alhambra, World Heritage Site)
5879 Almeria (Almeria)
5941 Valencia (Valencia)
7742 Altamira (Cave of Altamira)
9453 Mallorca (Majorca)
13260 Sabadell (Sabadell)
13868 Catalonia (Catalonia)
14967 Madrid (Madrid)
35725 Tramuntana (Tramontane (Tramuntana), a mountain chain)
99193 Obsfabra (Fabra Observatory in Barcelona)
117874 Picodelteide (Mount Teide (Pico del Teide), a volcano in Canary Islands)
127870 Vigo (Vigo, a municipality in Province of Pontevedra)
164589 La Sagra (La Sagra, a comarca)
181419 Dragonera (Sa Dragonera, is an uninhabited islet in the Balearic Islands)
185580 Andratx (Andratx, Mallorca)
189848 Eivissa (the Spain name for Ibiza, an island in the Mediterranean Sea)
196640 Mulhacén (Mulhacén, a mountain)
209540 Siurana (Siurana, a village in Catalonia)
216295 Menorca (Menorca, an island in Mediterranean Sea)
228180 Puertollano (Puertollano)
266465 Andalucia (Andalusia (Andalucia))
284029 Esplugafrancoli (L'Espluga de Francolí, a village in Catalonia)
309706 Avila (Ávila)
321024 Gijon (Gijon)
325366 Asturias (Asturias)
352834 Málaga (Málaga, a municipality in Province of Málaga)
353595 Grancanaria (Gran Canaria, an island of the Canary Islands)
392225 Lanzarote (Lanzarote,  a volcanic island, one of the seven Canary Islands)

Switzerland 
113390 Helvetia (Helvetia, Latin name for Switzerland)

Cities and villages 
1313 Berna (Bern, capital of Switzerland)
1938 Lausanna (Lausanne)
1935 Lucerna (Lucerne)
1936 Lugano (Lugano)
1937 Locarno (Locarno)
1775 Zimmerwald (Zimmerwald)
2033 Basilea (Basilea, the old name of Basel)
13025 Zürich (Zürich)
43669 Winterthur (Winterthur, Zürich)
77755 Delémont (Delémont)
104896 Schwanden (Schwanden, Glarus)

Regions (Cantons) 
1687 Glarona (Glarus)
1768 Appenzella (Appenzell)
30798 Graubünden (Graubünden)
42113 Jura (Jura)
47164 Ticino (Ticino)

Municipalities 
129342 Ependes (Épendes, Sarine, Fribourg)
144096 Wiesendangen (Wiesendangen, Winterthur, Zürich)
183114 Vicques (Vicques, Delémont, Jura)
184508 Courroux (Courroux, Delémont, Jura)
218752 Tentlingen (Tentlingen, Sense, Fribourg)
233943 Falera (Falera, Surselva, Graubünden)
284945 Saint-Imier (Saint-Imier, Bernese Jura, Bern)
314040 Tavannes (Tavannes, Bernese Jura, Bern)
318412 Tramelan (Tramelan, Bernese Jura, Bern)

Mountains / hills / rivers 
305254 Moron (Moron, a mountain)
331992 Chasseral (Chasseral, a mountain)
339486 Raimeux (Mont Raimeux, a mountain)
363582 Folpotat (Folpotat, a small river in an isolated Jura valley).

Turkey
25 Phocaea (Foça)
1174 Marmara (Sea of Marmara)
1457 Ankara (Ankara, capital of Turkey)
3286 Anatoliya (Anatolia)
96205 Ararat (Mount Ararat)
294296 Efeso (Ephesus or Efesos)

United Kingdom
1071 Brita (Great Britain)
2830 Greenwich (Greenwich)
5805 Glasgow (Glasgow)
7603 Salopia (Shropshire)
8837 London (London)
8849 Brighton (Brighton)
16481 Thames (Thames River)
11626 Church Stretton (Church Stretton)
69263 Big Ben (Big Ben, Westminster, the name of the great bell and clock tower)
100604 Lundy (Lundy, the largest island in the Bristol Channel)
129092 Snowdonia (Snowdon, the highest mountain in Wales)

North America

Canada
6714 Montréal (Montreal, Québec)
11780 Thunder Bay (Thunder Bay, Ontario)
12310 Londontario (London, Ontario)
35165 Québec (Quebec City, Québec)
96192 Calgary (Calgary, Alberta)
96193 Edmonton (Edmonton, Alberta)
159164 La Canada (Canada)
176710 Banff (Banff, Alberta)
176711 Canmore (Canmore, Alberta)
223950 Mississauga (Mississauga, Ontario)
516560 Annapolisroyal, (Annapolis Royal, Nova Scotia)

United States
916 America (United States of America)
2322 Kitt Peak (Kitt Peak, Arizona)
4337 Arecibo (Arecibo Observatory, Puerto Rico)
6117 Brevardastro (Brevard County, Florida, the home of the Kennedy Space Center, Cape Canaveral)
21651 Mission Valley (Mission Valley, San Diego)
49272 Bryce Canyon (Bryce Canyon National Park, Utah)
159814 Saguaro (Saguaro National Park, Arizona)
542600 Lindahall (Linda Hall Library, Kansas City)

States
50 Virginia (Virginia)
341 California (California)
359 Georgia (Georgia)
439 Ohio (Ohio)
793 Arizona (Arizona)
797 Montana (Montana)
1602 Indiana (Indiana)
3124 Kansas (Kansas)
4547 Massachusetts (Massachusetts)
10195 Nebraska (Nebraska)
13688 Oklahoma (Oklahoma)
19148 Alaska (Alaska)
26715 South Dakota (South Dakota)
35352 Texas (Texas)
48575 Hawaii (Hawaii)
114703 North Dakota (North Dakota)
503033 New Hampshire (New Hampshire)

Cities/Towns
334 Chicago (Chicago)
484 Pittsburghia (Pittsburgh, Pennsylvania)
508 Princetonia (Princeton University)
516 Amherstia (Amherst College, Massachusetts)
581 Tauntonia (Taunton, Massachusetts)
691 Lehigh (Lehigh University, Pennsylvania)
716 Berkeley (Berkeley, California)
736 Harvard (Harvard University)
1345 Potomac (Potomac)
2118 Flagstaff (Flagstaff, Arizona)
2224 Tucson (Tucson, AZ)
2284 San Juan (San Juan, Puerto Rico)
3031 Houston (Houston, Texas)
3043 San Diego (San Diego, California)
3512 Eriepa (Erie, Pennsylvania)
5870 Baltimore (Baltimore, Maryland)
6216 San Jose (San Jose, California)
6296 Cleveland (Cleveland, Ohio)
7041 Nantucket (Nantucket, Massachusetts)
8084 Dallas (Dallas, Texas)
10379 Lake Placid (Lake Placid, New York)
11739 Baton Rouge (Baton Rouge, Louisiana)
12382 Niagara Falls (Niagara Falls)
12464 Manhattan (Manhattan)
32570 Peruindiana (Peru, Indiana)
34419 Corning (Corning, New York)
34611 Nacogdoches (Nacogdoches, Texas)
35977 Lexington (Lexington, Massachusetts)
35978 Arlington (Arlington, Massachusetts)
54439 Topeka (Topeka, Kansas)
58221 Boston (Boston, Massachusetts)
82332 Las Vegas (Las Vegas, Nevada)
143641 Sapello (Sapello, New Mexico)
157064 Sedona (Sedona, Arizona)
284891 Kona (Kona District, Hawaii)
342431 Hilo (Hilo, Hawaii)
397279 Bloomsburg (Bloomsburg, Pennsylvania)

Mexico
6035 Citlaltépetl (Citlaltépetl, a dormant volcano and the highest mountain (5636 m) in Mexico)
10799 Yucatán (Yucatán, Mexico)
10806 Mexico (Mexico)
14217 Oaxaca (Oaxaca)
37471 Popocatepetl (Popocatépetl, an active volcano in Mexico)
293477 Teotihuacan, an ancient Mesoamerican city located in a sub-valley of the Valley of Mexico

Oceania

224 Oceana (Pacific Ocean)
235 Carolina (Caroline Island, Kiribati)
34901 Mauna Loa (Mauna Loa, the volcano forms the largest part of the Big Island of Hawaii)
40227 Tahiti (Tahiti, the largest island in French Polynesia)
81203 Polynesia (French Polynesia)
88292 Bora-Bora (Bora Bora Island, northwest of Tahiti)
145558 Raiatea (Raiatea Island, French Polynesia)
171183 Haleakala (Haleakala, volcano on the island of Maui)
188534 Mauna Kea (Mauna Kea, volcano on the island of Hawaii)
221465 Rapa Nui (Rapa Nui, the name of Easter Island in the Polynesian Rapanui language)
570814 Nauru (Nauru)

Australia
525 Adelaide (Adelaide)
3953 Perth (Perth)
5277 Brisbane (Brisbane)
8088 Australia (Australia)
11304 Cowra (Cowra, New South Wales, Australia)
15550 Sydney (Sydney)
336698 Melbourne (Melbourne)

New Zealand
3563 Canterbury (Canterbury, New Zealand)
19620 Auckland (Auckland, New Zealand)
101461 Dunedin (Dunedin, New Zealand)
386622 New Zealand (New Zealand)
507490 Possum (Possum Observatory, New Zealand)

Polar regions

1031 Arctica (The Arctic)
2404 Antarctica (Antarctica)
110298 Deceptionisland (Deception Island, a volcano in Antarctica)

South and Central America
1042 Amazone (Amazon River)
1779 Paraná (Paraná River, a river in south Central South America)
26027 Cotopaxi (Cotopaxi, an active stratovolcano in the Andes Mountains)

Country
293 Brasilia (Brazil)
469 Argentina (Argentina)
4636 Chile (Chile)
9357 Venezuela (Venezuela)
10071 Paraguay (Paraguay)
10072 Uruguay (Uruguay)
10792 Ecuador (Ecuador)
10797 Guatemala (Guatemala)
10866 Peru (Peru)
11055 Honduras (Honduras)
11094 Cuba (Cuba)
11908 Nicaragua (Nicaragua)
325558 Guyane (French Guiana)

Cities, mountains and others 
1008 La Paz (La Paz, Bolivia)
1029 La Plata (La Plata, Argentina)
1821 Aconcagua (Aconcagua Mountain and Aconcagua River, Argentina)
7850 Buenos Aires (Buenos Aires, capital of Argentina)
8277 Machu-Picchu (Machu Picchu, Peru)
8279 Cuzco (Cuzco, Peru)
10468 Itacuruba (Itacuruba, Brazil)
10867 Lima (Lima, Peru)
11083 Caracas (Caracas, Venezuela)
11095 Havana (Havana, Cuba)
11193 Mérida (Mérida, Venezuela)
11334 Rio de Janeiro (Rio de Janeiro, Brazil)
11335 Santiago (Santiago, Chile)
12325 Bogota (Bogotá, Colombia)
13509 Guayaquil (Guayaquil, Ecuador)
18725 Atacama (Atacama Desert, Chile)
30797 Chimborazo (Chimborazo, Ecuador)
32987 Uyuni (Salar de Uyuni, the largest salty expanse on the planet, located in Bolivia)
37596 Cotahuasi (Cotahuasi Canyon, Peru)
48451 Pichincha (Mount Pichincha, Ecuador)
78816 Caripito (Caripito, Venezuela)
110295 Elcalafate (El Calafate, Argentina)
117997 Irazu (Irazu, a volcano in Costa Rica)
128166 Carora (Carora, Venezuela)
129555 Armazones (Cerro Armazones, Chile)
366272 Medellin (Medellin, Colombia)

Fictional places
279 Thule (Thule)
1198 Atlantis (Atlantis)
1282 Utopia (Utopia)
1309 Hyperborea (Hyperborea)
5405 Neverland (Neverland)
9500 Camelot (Camelot)

See also

List of minor planets
List of minor planets named after people
List of minor planets named after rivers
Meanings of minor planet names

References

Jet Propulsion Laboratory. "JPL Small-Body Database Browser" http://ssd.jpl.nasa.gov/sbdb.cgi (accessed 6 April 2012).

 
Places